Chiara Samugheo (25 March 1935 – 13 January 2022) was an Italian neorealist photographer and photojournalist.

Life and work
Samugheo was born in Bari, Italy. She was known as the first female professional photographer in Italy. She photographed film stars and celebrities during the 1950s and 1960s there.

Her work is included in the collection of the Museum of Fine Arts Houston and is archived at the Centre des études et Archives de la Communication (CSAC) of University of Parma.

She died in Bari on 13 January 2022, at the age of 86.

Publications
 Costumi di Sardegna (1982)
 Sardegna nel Sinis
 Stelle di carta (1984)
 O dolce mio (1985)
 Lucca e la Lucchesia
 Vanità sarda
 Vicenza e Palladio
 Sardegna, quasi un continente
 I Nebrodi
 Bacco in Sardegna
 Natura magica della Sardegna
 Le corti del verde
 Al cinema con le stelle
 Il reale e l'effimero
 Cento dive
 Cento anni di cinema
 Carnaval de Rio

Collections
Samugheo's work is held in the following permanent collection:
 Museum of Fine Arts, Houston

References

1935 births
2022 deaths
People from Bari
20th-century Italian photographers
20th-century Italian women artists
21st-century Italian photographers
21st-century Italian women artists